Emily Young (born 1951) is a British sculptor.

Emily Young may also refer to:

 Emily Young (film director) (born 1970), English film director and screenwriter
 Emily Young (skier) (born 1991), Canadian Paralympic cross-country skier and biathlete
 E. H. Young (Emily Hilda Young, 1880–1949), English novelist
 Emily Young (Stargate), a character in Stargate
 Emily Young (Twilight), a character in Twilight